Wilkes County Schools is the name of two school districts in the United States:

 Wilkes County Schools (Georgia)
 Wilkes County Schools (North Carolina)